The 1964 Idaho Vandals football team represented the University of Idaho in the 1964 NCAA University Division football season. The Vandals were led by third-year head coach Dee Andros and were an independent in the NCAA's University Division. Home games were played on campus at Neale Stadium in Moscow, with one home game in Boise at old Bronco Stadium at Boise Junior College.

Season
Led on the field by quarterback Mike Monahan and sophomore fullback Ray McDonald, the Vandals won 28–13 in the Battle of the Palouse with neighbor Washington State, the first win in a decade, and the last in Idaho. The Cougars were led by first-year head coach Bert Clark, a former teammate of Andros at Oklahoma. The Vandals split the final four games to finish at 4–6.

Although Idaho was a charter member of the new Big Sky Conference, it did not participate in football until 1965, and was an independent from 1959 through 1964. They did not play any Big Sky teams in 1964 and all ten opponents were in the University Division; only two games were played on campus in Moscow, the latter was the win over neighboring WSU on October 24.

Although the Vandals finished with a losing record, they played the four Arizona and Oregon schools close, allowing less than fifteen points to each. After the season in early February, Andros left for Oregon State, where he coached for eleven seasons and then became athletic director. Defensive coach Steve Musseau succeeded him as head coach at Idaho.

Schedule

Roster

NFL Draft
One senior was selected in the 1965 NFL Draft, which lasted twenty rounds (280 selections).

 Selected in the fifth round of the AFL draft (35th overall), Leetzow played two seasons with the Denver Broncos.

Four juniors were selected in the 1966 NFL Draft, which lasted twenty rounds (305 selections).

Four sophomores were selected in the 1967 NFL/AFL Draft, the first common draft, which lasted seventeen rounds (445 selections).

List of Idaho Vandals in the NFL Draft

References

External links
Gem of the Mountains: 1965 University of Idaho yearbook – 1964 football season
Go Mighty Vandals – 1964 football season
Idaho Argonaut – student newspaper – 1964 editions

Idaho
Idaho Vandals football seasons
Idaho Vandals football